The Ministry of Natural Resources, Environment and Climate Change,  is a ministry of the Government of Malaysia that is responsible for energy, natural resources, environment, climate change, land, mines, minerals, geoscience, biodiversity, wildlife, national parks, forestry, surveying, mapping and geospatial data.

Organisation
 Minister of Natural Resources, Environment and Climate Change
 Deputy Minister of Natural Resources, Environment and Climate Change
 Secretary-General
 Under the Authority of Secretary-General
 Internal Audit Unit
 Legal Advisory Unit
 Corporate Communication Unit
 Integrity Unit
 Key Performance Indicator Unit
 Strategic Planning and International Division
 Deputy Secretary-General (Natural Resources)
 Land, Survey and Geospatial Division
 Minerals and Geoscience Division
 Biodiversity Management dan Forestry Division
 REDD Plus Unit
 Deputy Secretary-General (Energy)
 Energy Supply Division
 Sustainable Energy Division
 Senior Under-Secretary (Management Services)
 Administration and Finance Division
 Information Management Division
 Human Resources Management Division
 Development Division
 Account Division

Federal departments
 Department of Director General of Lands and Mines (Federal), or Jabatan Ketua Pengarah Tanah dan Galian Persekutuan (JKPTG). (Official site)
 Department of Survey and Mapping Malaysia, or Jabatan Ukur dan Pemetaan Malaysia (JUPEM). (Official site)
 Minerals and Geoscience Department Malaysia, or Jabatan Mineral dan Geosains Malaysia (JMG). (Official site)
 Forestry Department Peninsular Malaysia, or Jabatan Perhutanan Semenanjung Malaysia (JPSM). (Official site)
 Department of Wildlife and National Parks Peninsular Malaysia, or Jabatan Perlindungan Hidupan Liar Dan Taman Negara Semenanjung Malaysia (PERHILITAN). (Official site)
 National Institute of Land and Survey, or Institut Tanah dan Ukur Negara (INSTUN). (Official site)
 Department of Environment (DOE), or Jabatan Alam Sekitar (JAS). (Official site)

Statutory Bodies

 Forest Research Institute Malaysia (FRIM), or Institut Penyelidikan Perhutanan Malaysia. (Official site)
 Sustainable Energy Development Authority (SEDA) Malaysia, or Pihak Berkuasa Pembangunan Tenaga Lestari Malaysia (SEDA). (Official site)
 The Tin Industry (Research And Development) Board, or Lembaga (Penyelidikan & Kemajuan) Perusahaan Timah. (Official site)

Professional Institution

 Board of Geologists Malaysia (BoG), or Lembaga Ahli Geologi. (Official site)
 Land Surveyors Board Peninsular Malaysia, or Lembaga Juruukur Tanah. (site)

Key legislation
The Ministry of Natural Resources, Environment and Climate Change is responsible for administration of several key Acts:
Lands
 Continental Shelf Act 1966 [Act 83]
 Small Estates (Distribution) Act 1955 [Act 98]
 Aboriginal Peoples Act 1954 [Act 134]
 Strata Titles Act 1985 [Act 318]
 Federal Lands Commissioner Act 1957 [Act 349]
 Stamp Act 1949 [Act 378]
 Land Conservation Act 1960 [Act 385]
 Interpretation Acts 1948 and 1967 (Consolidated and Revised 1989) [Act 388]
 Land Acquisition Act 1960 [Act 486]
 Padi Cultivators (Control of Rent and Security of Tenure) Act 1967 [Act 528]
 Land (Group Settlement Areas) Act 1960 [Act 530]
 National Land Code (Validation) Act 2003 [Act 625]
Mineral and Geoscience
 Geological Survey Act 1974 [Act 129]
 Mineral Development Act 1994 [Act 525]
Forestry
 National Forestry Act 1984 [Act 313]
 Wood-based Industries (State Legislatures Competency) Act 1984 [Act 314]
 Malaysian Forestry Research and Development Board Act 1985 [Act 319]
 International Trade in Endangered Species Act 2008 [Act 686]
Biodiversity
 Access to Biological Resources and Benefit Sharing Act 2017 [Act 795]
 National Parks Act 1980 [Act 226]
 Fisheries Act 1985 [Act 317]
 Fees (Marine Parks Malaysia) (Validation) Act 2004 [Act 635]
 Biosafety Act 2007 [Act 678]
 Wildlife Conservation Act 2010 [Act 716]
Environment
 Environmental Quality Act 1974 [Act 127]
 Exclusive Economic Zone Act 1984 [Act 311]
Water
 Drainage Works Act 1954 [Act 354]
 Waters Act 1920 [Act 418]
 Water Supply (Federal Territory of Kuala Lumpur) Act 1998 [Act 581]
 Water Services Industry Act 2006 [Act 655]

Policy Priorities of the Government of the Day
 National Water Resources Policy
 National Mineral Policy
 National Forestry Policy
 National Biodiversity Policy
 National Biological Diversity 2016-2025

See also
Minister of Natural Resources, Environment and Climate Change (Malaysia)

References

External links
 Ministry of Water, Land and Natural Resources
 

Federal ministries, departments and agencies of Malaysia
Malaysia
Malaysia
Malaysia
Malaysia
Malaysia
Malaysia
Forestry in Malaysia
Mining in Malaysia
Irrigation in Malaysia
Water in Malaysia
Ministries established in 2004
2004 establishments in Malaysia